Supetar is a town on the northern side of the Dalmatian island of Brač, in the Split-Dalmatia County, in Croatia. It became the island's official centre in 1827. The Town of Supetar includes Supetar itself and the three villages: Splitska, Škrip and Mirca.

With a population of 3,213, it is the island's largest town. It is accessible by ferry (Jadrolinija, the ferry ride from the mainland city of Split takes 45 minutes) or via Brač Airport which is located 30 kilometres to the southeast.

History

Old Supetar was situated on the small peninsula where there is now a graveyard. The settlement came to an end during the early Christian era. In the late Middle Ages a new settlement started around the bay known as St. Peter's, from which the town derives its name. It originated from Sv. Petar during the Latin population of the town. "Sv" stands for "Sveti", meaning saint, therefore it takes its name from Saint Peter, which is the name's English equivalent translation.

The town's main period of development occurred during the 18th and 19th centuries when Supetar took over from Nerežišća as the administrative centre of the island of Brač.

The town
The Parish church of St. Peter (Sveti Petar) stands on the side of an old chapel which was restored in 1773 in a Baroque architectural style. At that time it also received a new aisle and bell tower. It was extended in 1887. In the church there are paintings by the local artist Feliks Tironi from the second half of the 18th century and a Baroque altarpiece by an unknown Venetian artist of the 18th century.

In the old part of the church there are some gravestones with Croatian inscriptions and at the entrance to the church there is a font made of two large Gothic capitals. On the left of the church building there is a sundial and beneath it a sarcophagus with the date 1774 engraved. In the Sunday school classrooms there are paintings from the Venetian era (16th and 17th centuries). The well, decorated with reliefs, is the work of Johannes Mazzonius from 1734.

Supetar graveyard beside the Chapel St. Nicholas (Sveti Nikola Putnik) there are two old Christian sarcophagi and several gravestones (Pieta), which are the work of Ivan Rendić of Supetar (1849–1932), and the mausoleum of the Petrinović family with portraits and sculptures, by the sculptor Toma Rosandić (1878–1958).

Population

Supetar in the news
Slobodna Dalmacija daily reported in 2009 that a housing development called Adriatica is being built in McKinney, Texas, United States, by real estate developer Jeff Blackard as a partial faithful replica of Supetar.

Notable people
 
 
Tonči Matulić (born 1966), Catholic priest, author, university professor, and bioethicist

References

External links

 Supetar Tourist Board
 Supetar at Geonames.com
  Supetar-Brač Online

Cities and towns in Croatia
Populated coastal places in Croatia
Brač
Populated places in Split-Dalmatia County